Daniel Vasev (born 23 May 1994) is a Bulgarian footballer who plays as a midfielder for Bulgarian Second League club Marek Dupnitsa.

He is a son of the former football player and now manager Dimitar Vasev.

Career
In July 2016, Vasev signed with Botev Vratsa.  He moved to Lokomotiv Sofia in January 2017.

In July 2017, Vasev joined Montana.

In February 2018, Vasev signed with Lokomotiv Gorna Oryahovitsa.}  He left the club in April following a disagreement regarding bonus payments.

References

External links

1994 births
Living people
Footballers from Sofia
Bulgarian footballers
Association football midfielders
PFC Slavia Sofia players
PFC Pirin Gotse Delchev players
FC Botev Vratsa players
FC Lokomotiv 1929 Sofia players
PFC Lokomotiv Mezdra players
PFC Spartak Pleven players
FC Montana players
FC Lokomotiv Gorna Oryahovitsa players
FC Sportist Svoge players
First Professional Football League (Bulgaria) players
Second Professional Football League (Bulgaria) players